Clarence River is a  long river that flows through Yukon, Canada and the U.S. state of Alaska into the Beaufort Sea.

Course 
The Clarence River rises southwest of Mount Paige in Yukon, Canada, and flows northwest and northeast, crossing the border several times into the North Slope Borough of Alaska.  It empties into Clarence Lagoon and finally the Beaufort Sea in the Arctic Ocean.

History 
The river was surveyed in 1826 by British explorer John Franklin as the westernmost river in the then-British territories on the Arctic coast near the line of demarcation with Russia.  Franklin named the river Clarence in honor of Lord High Admiral Prince William, Duke of Clarence and St Andrews.

See also
List of rivers of Alaska
List of rivers of Yukon

Notes 
Clarence Lagoon is the northwesternmost point of the Yukon Territory, and also of continental Canada.

References 

Rivers of Alaska
Rivers of Yukon
International rivers of North America
Rivers of North Slope Borough, Alaska